Margaret Mills may refer to:

 Margaret Mills (folklorist) (born 1946), folklorist and professor
 Margaret Mills (actress) (died 1717), British stage actress
 Margaret Mills (bowls), Zimbabwean lawn bowler